The Ontario Federation of Labour is a federation of labour unions in the Canadian province of Ontario.  The original OFL was established by the Canadian Congress of Labour in 1944. It was merged with the rival Ontario Provincial Federation of Labour in 1957 (now considered the modern OFL's founding date), one year after the merger of the CCL and the Trades and Labour Congress (the OPFL's parent federation). It is now the provincial federation of the Canadian Labour Congress.

Elroy Robson was the original OFL's first president and William Sefton was its first secretary-treasurer.

Policy conventions are held every two years. Today, the federation represents 700,000 workers who belong to its affiliated trade unions.

Officers of the OFL since 1957

Presidents
Cleve Kidd (1957–1958)
David Archer (1958–1976)
Cliff Pilkey (1976–1986)
Gord Wilson (1986–1997)
Wayne Samuelson (1997–2009)
Sid Ryan (2009–2015)
Chris Buckley (2015–2019)
Patty Coates (2019–present)

Secretary-Treasurer
Douglas Hamilton (1957–1970)
Terry Meagher (1970–1984)
Wally Majesky (1984–1986)
Sean O'Flynn (1986–1988)
Julie Davis (1988–1995)
Ethel Birkett-LaValley (1995–2005)
Irene Harris (2005–2009)
Marie Kelly (2009–2011)
Nancy Hutchison (2011–2015)
Patty Coates (2015-2019)
Ahmad Gaied (2019–present)

Executive Vice-Presidents
Julie Davis (1986–1988)
Ken Signoretti (1988–1997)
Irene Harris (1997–2005)
Terry Downey (2005–2011)
Irwin Nanda (2011–2015)
Ahmad Gaied (2015-2019)
Janice Folk-Dawson (2019–Present)

References

External links
OFL home page

Canadian Labour Congress
Trade unions in Ontario
Provincial federations of labour (Canada)
Trade unions established in 1957
1957 establishments in Ontario